Bonner County is a county in the northern part of the U.S. state of Idaho. As of the 2020 census, the population was 47,110. The county seat and largest city is Sandpoint. Partitioned from Kootenai County and established in 1907, it was named for Edwin L. Bonner, a ferry operator.

Bonner County comprises the Sandpoint, Idaho Micropolitan Statistical Area.

History
Bonner County was formed on February 21, 1907. It was named for travel entrepreneur Edwin L. Bonner, a ferry operator.

In 1864, the Idaho Legislature created the counties of Lah-Toh and Kootenai. Kootenai County initially covered all of present-day Bonner and Boundary counties and a portion of present-day Kootenai County. It also overlapped part of the existing boundary of Shoshone County. Sin-na-ac-qua-teen, a trading post in present-day Bonner County on the south shore of the Pend Oreille River near Laclede, was named county seat. The government of Kootenai failed to organize due to lack of settlement within the county boundary. In 1867, the legislature repealed the act that created the two counties and consolidated them into a county that retained the Kootenai name. Rathdrum became the county seat when Kootenai County organized in 1881.

The tiny portion of Bonner County south of the 48th parallel and east of Shoshone County was not in any of Idaho's counties from 1863 to 1907, the longest time frame any non-county area existed in the State of Idaho. The Idaho panhandle north of the Clearwater River's basin was in Spokane County, Washington, prior to Idaho's creation as a territory in 1863. When Idaho defined its original counties by February, 1864, it attached the former Spokane County area to Nez Perce County for judicial purposes. Legislators creating Kootenai County in December 1864 lacked knowledge of the geography of the area and failed to fully include the non-county area within the county boundaries of Kootenai or Lah-Toh. The non-county area was fully included within Bonner County when it was formed in 1907.

Boundary County was formed from Bonner County in 1915.

Geography

Adjacent counties
Pend Oreille County, Washington– northwest
Boundary County – north
Lincoln County, Montana – east/Mountain Time Border
Sanders County, Montana – southeast/Mountain Time Border
Shoshone County – southeast
Kootenai County – south
Spokane County, Washington – southwest

National protected areas
 Pacific Northwest National Scenic Trail (part)
 Coeur d'Alene National Forest (part)
 Kaniksu National Forest (part)
 Kootenai National Forest (part)

Major highways
 US 2
 US 95
 SH-41
 SH-57
 SH-200

Rivers and lakes

Albeni Falls Dam
Clark Fork River
Cocolalla
Kelso Lake
Lake Pend Oreille
Pack River
Pend Oreille River
Priest Lake

Demographics

2000 census
As of the census of 2000, there were 36,835 people, 14,693 households, and 10,270 families living in the county. The population density was 21 people per square mile (8/km2). There were 19,646 housing units at an average density of 11 per square mile (4/km2). The racial makeup of the county was 96.58% White, 0.11% Black or African American, 0.87% Native American, 0.27% Asian, 0.05% Pacific Islander, 0.42% from other races, and 1.70% from two or more races. 1.64% of the population were Hispanic or Latino of any race. 20.9% were of German, 11.7% English, 11.7% American, 9.6% Irish and 5.3% Norwegian ancestry.

There were 14,693 households, out of which 30.60% had children under the age of 18 living with them, 58.60% were married couples living together, 7.50% had a female householder with no husband present, and 30.10% were non-families. 24.00% of all households were made up of individuals, and 8.20% had someone living alone who was 65 years of age or older. The average household size was 2.49 and the average family size was 2.94.

In the county, the population was spread out, with 25.50% under the age of 18, 6.70% from 18 to 24, 25.40% from 25 to 44, 29.30% from 45 to 64, and 13.10% who were 65 years of age or older. The median age was 41 years. For every 100 females there were 100.30 males. For every 100 females age 18 and over, there were 98.20 males.

The median income for a household in the county was $32,803, and the median income for a family was $37,930. Males had a median income of $32,504 versus $21,086 for females. The per capita income for the county was $17,263. About 11.90% of families and 15.50% of the population were below the poverty line, including 21.20% of those under age 18 and 10.20% of those age 65 or over.

2010 census
As of the 2010 United States Census, there were 40,877 people, 17,100 households, and 11,591 families living in the county. The racial makeup of the county was 96.0% white, 0.8% American Indian, 0.5% Asian, 0.1% Pacific islander, 0.1% black or African American, 0.4% from other races, and 2.1% from two or more races. Those of Hispanic or Latino origin made up 2.2% of the population. In terms of ancestry, 25.4% were German, 15.3% were Irish, 15.2% were English, 6.2% were Norwegian, and 5.0% were American.

Of the 17,100 households, 27.2% had children under the age of 18 living with them, 55.3% were married couples living together, 7.9% had a female householder with no husband present, 32.2% were non-families, and 26.0% of all households were made up of individuals. The average household size was 2.37 and the average family size was 2.82. The median age was 45.8 years.

The median income for a household in the county was $41,943 and the median income for a family was $51,377. Males had a median income of $40,076 versus $30,829 for females. The per capita income for the county was $24,745. About 10.1% of families and 14.3% of the population were below the poverty line, including 22.3% of those under age 18 and 6.7% of those age 65 or over.

Politics
Like other counties in Idaho, Bonner County is strongly Republican-leaning. The last Democrat to win the county in a presidential election was Bill Clinton in 1992, and incumbent president George H.W. Bush fell to third place in the county, behind independent candidate Ross Perot. The tourism-oriented city of Sandpoint is more of a swing town and occasionally backs Democrats, but the rest of the county remains strongly Republican.

Communities

Cities

Sandpoint
Clark Fork
Dover
East Hope
Hope
Kootenai
Oldtown
Ponderay
Priest River

Census-designated place
Blanchard 

 Coolin
 Laclede

Unincorporated communities

Careywood
Cocolalla
Colburn
Lamb Creek
Nordman
Outlet Bay
Sagle
Vans Corner
Westmond

Ski area
Schweitzer Mountain Resort

See also
National Register of Historic Places listings in Bonner County, Idaho

References

External links
 Bonner County website
 Bonner County Historical Society

 

 
Idaho counties
1907 establishments in Idaho
Populated places established in 1907